Yordan Piperkov (1870–1903), widely known as Yordan Piperkata, was a Macedonian Bulgarian revolutionary from the early 20th century, member of the Supreme Macedonian-Adrianople Committee and later of the Internal Macedonian-Adrianople Revolutionary Organization (IMARO).

Life
He was born in Kozica, Ottoman Empire, today in Kičevo Municipality, North Macedonia to a poor family. He could not graduate at the Bulgarian secondary school in Bitola, because his family moved to Sofia, Bulgaria, where he met insurgents from the Kresna-Razlog Uprising and other vojvods. This sparked in him an interest for the Macedonian liberation movement. Later Piperkata was active in the Supreme Macedonian Committee chetas' action in 1895 in Ottoman Macedonia. He joined the Internal Macedonian-Adrianople Revolutionary Organization in 1897. The assassination of a Turkish bey, in which he also participated, forced him to leave Ottoman Macedonia and return to Bulgaria. With the detachment of Mirche Atsev he returned to Macedonia in June 1900, after which he formed his own detachment in the Krushevo region. Afterwards he several times entered Macedonia from Bulgaria with different chetas. During the Ilinden uprising, he attacked the Albanian village of Pribilci with 900 insurgents, then fought near Kicevo. After the burning of the village of Cer by the Ottomans, Piperkata and three other rebels went to investigate the damages in the burned village, where Piperkata was killed by Turks, who had organized an ambush there. After the death of Yordan, his assistant, the Bulgarian Army officer  Dimitar Dechev, took his place. Dechev took avenge on the Turks for Yordan's murder.

References

Sources

 "Революционната дейность въ Демирхисаръ (битолско) по спомени на Алексо Стефановъ Демирхисарски войвода)", Съобщава Боянъ Мирчев, София—Печатница П.Глушковъ — 1931 стр.27-29
 "Илюстрация Илинден", година І, брой 3, стр. 13, 14

1870 births
1903 deaths
People from Kičevo Municipality
Bulgarian revolutionaries
Macedonia under the Ottoman Empire
Members of the Internal Macedonian Revolutionary Organization
Macedonian Bulgarians